The Raimo Kilpiö trophy is an ice hockey trophy awarded by the Finnish Liiga to the player who has shown the most sportsmanship and good behaviour as well as high quality performance for their team. It is named after Raimo Kilpiö who played in the top level of Finnish ice hockey for 21 years in 1953-77. In 2019 it was awarded to Kristian Kuusela of Tappara.

Trophy winners

References

Liiga trophies and awards
Sportsmanship trophies and awards